HMS Locust was a B-class torpedo boat destroyer of the British Royal Navy. She was launched by Laird, Son & Company, Birkenhead, on 5 December 1896. She served in the Mediterranean between 1902 and 1906, and was used for patrol and escort duties during the First World War

Construction
Locust was ordered on 23 December 1896 as the third of six 30-knotter destroyers programmed to be built by Lairds under the 1895–1896 shipbuilding programme for the Royal Navy. These followed on from four very similar destroyers ordered from Lairds as part of the 1894–1895 programme.

Displacement was  light and  full load.

Armament was the standard for the 30-knotters, i.e. a QF 12 pounder 12 cwt ( calibre) gun on a platform on the ship's conning tower (in practice the platform was also used as the ship's bridge), with a secondary armament of five 6-pounder guns, and two 18-inch (450 mm) torpedo tubes. The ship had a crew of 63 officers and men.

Locust was laid down at Laird's Birkenhead shipyard as Yard number 623 on 20 April 1894 and was launched on 5 December 1896, when she was named by Miss Busk. She was completed in July 1898.

Service history
On 2 February 1900 she was commissioned as tender to HMS Vivid, shore establishment at Devonport, for service in the Devonport Instructional flotilla, and Lieutenant Stephen Herbert Radcliffe was appointed in command. A mere week into her commission, she had her stem damaged while in the Falmouth harbour when the destroyer  dragged her moorings and drifted into Locust and other ships of the flotilla. Following repairs in Devonport, she was back in the flotilla the following month. Lieutenant Hepworth Staley Alton was appointed in command on 15 January 1901, and was in charge as she took part in the 1901 Naval Manoeuvres. On 5 December 1901 she was recommissioned as tender to the battleship  on the Mediterranean station. She left Devonport for Malta in January the following year. Lieutenant the Hon. Arthur Brandreth Scott Dutton was appointed in command in April 1902, and in August that year she visited Lemnos.

The future Admiral of the Fleet, Andrew Cunningham, was appointed her second-in-command while a sub-lieutenant, in September 1903. Locust returned to the United Kingdom in 1906.

On 30 August 1912 the Admiralty directed all destroyers were to be grouped into classes designated by letters based on contract speed and appearance. As a four-funneled 30-knotter destroyer, Locust was assigned to the B Class.

Locust was a member of the Fifth Destroyer Flotilla, based at Devonport, in 1912, and after a reorganisation of the Royal Navy's destroyer flotillas in 1912, with older destroyers being transferred to patrol flotillas, joined the Seventh Destroyer Flotilla, also based at Devonport.

Locust remained part of the Seventh Patrol Flotilla in August 1914, which transferred to the Humber on the East coast of England following the outbreak of the First World War. In November 1914, Locust was transferred to Scapa Flow, where she carried out local patrol and escort duties. Locust remained part of the Scapa Flow local patrol forces until January 1918, but transferred to the Firth of Forth as part of the Methil Convoy Flotilla by February that year. By May 1918, Locust had moved again, returning to the Seventh Flotilla based on the Humber, remaining there until the end of the war.

Locust was sold for scrap to J. Jackson on 10 June 1919.

Pennant numbers

References

Bibliography
 
 
 
 
 

 

 

Earnest-class destroyers
Ships built on the River Mersey
1896 ships
B-class destroyers (1913)
World War I destroyers of the United Kingdom